Sink the Bismarck! is a 1960 black-and-white CinemaScope British war film based on the 1959 book The Last Nine Days of the Bismarck by C. S. Forester. It stars Kenneth More and Dana Wynter and was directed by Lewis Gilbert. To date, it is the only film made that deals directly with the operations, chase and sinking of the battleship  by the Royal Navy during the Second World War. Although war films were common in the 1960s, Sink the Bismarck! was seen as something of an anomaly, with much of its time devoted to the "unsung back-room planners as much as on the combatants themselves". Its historical accuracy, in particular, met with much praise despite a number of inconsistencies.

Sink the Bismarck! was the inspiration for Johnny Horton's popular 1960 song, "Sink the Bismarck".
The film had its Royal World Premiere in the presence of the Duke of Edinburgh at the Odeon Leicester Square on 11 February 1960.

Plot
In early 1939, Nazi Germany's most powerful battleship, is launched, beginning a new era of German sea power. Two years later, after war has begun, British naval intelligence discovers Bismarck and the heavy cruiser  are about to sail into the North Atlantic to attack Allied convoys. From a London underground war room, Captain Jonathan Shepard (Kenneth More) coordinates the hunt for the dreaded Bismarck. The battle results in the annihilation and violent disintegration of the Hood, shocking combatants on both sides. Now Prince of Wales is alone and is fired on by the two German ships. However, it manages to inflict damage on the Bismarck's bow. Bismarck returns fire, destroying the Prince of Wales''' bridge. Eventually, Prince of Wales emits a smoke screen behind which to retreat. Bismarck and Prinz Eugen also retreat, but they are shadowed by the cruisers HMS Suffolk and HMS Norfolk using radar. Later, Prinz Eugen breaks away and heads toward the port of Brest, in occupied France, while Bismarck turns and fires at the British cruisers to provide cover as it escapes. The attack forces the cruisers to retreat. An air assault from the carrier  damages Bismarck's fuel tanks, but the vessel is otherwise largely undamaged.

Back at London's operations headquarters, Captain Shepard gambles that Admiral Gunther Lütjens, in command of Bismarck, is returning to friendly waters where U-boats and air cover will make it impossible to attack, so he plans to intercept and attack the German vessel before it reaches safety. Shepard commits a disproportionately large force to the search, and his wager proves correct when Bismarck is located steaming toward the French coast. British forces have a narrow time window in which to destroy or slow their prey before German support and their own diminishing fuel supplies can preclude further attacks. Swordfish torpedo planes from HMS Ark Royal have two chances. The first fails when the pilots misidentify  as Bismarck, but thankfully their new magnetic torpedo detonators are faulty, with most exploding as soon as they hit the sea. Returning to the carrier and changing to conventional contact exploders, their second attack, this time on the "real" Bismarck, is successful. One torpedo causes only minor damage; but a catastrophic second hit detonates near the stern, jamming the German battleship's rudder, drastically slowing her down.

Unable to repair its rudder, Bismarck steams in circles. During the night the German battleship is attacked by two British destroyers. They fire torpedoes, and one hits; but Bismarck returns fire, sinking the destroyer HMS Solent. The main force of British ships (including battleships  and ) find Bismarck the next day and rain shells upon her. Lütjens in his final moments insists that German forces will arrive to save them, but he dies when a shell destroys Bismarcks bridge. Shortly afterwards, the remaining bridge officers are killed, and the crew abandon their sinking ship. On board King George V, Admiral John Tovey orders the newly joined cruiser  to finish off Bismarck. The cruiser fires six torpedoes at the severely damaged German battleship. Four torpedoes strike home, causing the vessel to sink faster than its crew can escape. The captain of King George V, Wilfrid Patterson, lowers his head as Bismarck rolls over and disappears beneath the waves. Admiral Tovey orders Dorsetshire to pick up survivors, finally saying tersely: "Well, gentlemen, let's go home."

Cast

Ashore

 Kenneth More as Captain Jonathan Shepard (More had served as a Royal Navy lieutenant on HMS Victorious during the war.) 
 Dana Wynter as Women's Royal Naval Service Second Officer (WRNS) Anne Davis
 Laurence Naismith as First Sea Lord Admiral Sir Dudley Pound. (Naismith served in the Royal Artillery in the war.)
 Geoffrey Keen as Assistant Chief of the Naval Staff (A.C.N.S.)
 Michael Goodliffe as Captain Banister. (Captured at Dunkirk after being shot in the leg.)
 Maurice Denham as Commander Richards. (Served in the Medical Corps in the war.)
 Peter Dyneley as Commander Jenkins (uncredited)
 Norman Shelley as voice of Winston Churchill (uncredited)
 Jack Watling as RNVR Signals Officer
 Thomas Waldron Price as Flag Lieutenant to First Sea Lord
 Seán Barrett as Able Seaman Brown
 Victor Maddern as Leading seaman, in closing scene outside Admiralty (uncredited)
 Graham Stark as Petty Officer Williams

and
 Edward R. Murrow as himself: Ed Murrow, CBS London radio correspondent in 1941

At sea

 Karel Štěpánek as Admiral Günther Lütjens in Bismarck Carl Möhner as Captain Lindemann of Bismarck (voice: Robert Rietti)
 Walter Hudd as Admiral Holland, in HMS Hood John Stuart as Captain Kerr of HMS Hood Esmond Knight as Captain Leach of HMS Prince of Wales. (Knight served as a gunnery officer on board Prince of Wales, and was seriously injured and blinded during the battle with Bismarck.)
 Johnny Briggs as Young Seaman in Prince of Wales (uncredited)
 Sydney Tafler as Henry, civilian workman aboard Prince of Wales Sam Kydd as civilian workman aboard Prince of Wales Julian Somers as civilian workman aboard HMS Prince of Wales Ernest Clark as Captain Ellis, HMS Suffolk Mark Dignam as Captain Maund, HMS Ark Royal John Stride as Tom Shepard, Captain Shepard's son, TAG (Telegraphist/Air Gunner) in Ark Royal's Swordfish squadron (uncredited)
 David Hemmings as seaman in Ark Royal (uncredited)
 John Horsley as Captain, HMS Sheffield Peter Burton as Captain Philip Vian, 4th Destroyer Flotilla
 Jack Gwillim as Captain Wilfrid Patterson, HMS King George V. (Gwillim served 20 years in the Royal Navy, rising to the rank of commander.)
 Michael Hordern as Admiral Sir John Tovey, C-in-C Home Fleet, in HMS King George V. (Hordern served as a lieutenant commander on HMS Illustrious during the war.)
 Edward Judd as Navigating Officer on board Prince of Wales (uncredited).

Production
C. S. Forester reportedly wrote the story as a screen treatment for 20th Century Fox before even writing the book.

Writer Edmund H. North worked closely with Forester's story, compressing events and time lines to make the plot taut. Along with the director, he decided to use a documentary-style technique, switching back-and-forth from a fairly insular war room to action taking place on remote battleships. The action is made more realistic when the human element of men in a game of wits and nerves is involved. The use of Edward R. Murrow reprising his wartime broadcasts from London also lends an air of authenticity and near-documentary feel. The film credits identify the actual Director of Operations as Capt. R. A. B. Edwards and "Capt. Shepard" as fictional. The Shepard-Davis interplay added human interest to the storyline.

In a similar manner, the battle between British and German forces is also recreated as a human drama, with Admiral Lütjens pitted against Captain Shepard in a "psychological chess match".

Ships involvedSink the Bismarck! was made in 1960, as the last major Second World War fleet units were being retired. Producer John Brabourne was able to use his influence as son-in-law of Lord Mountbatten, then Chief of the Defence Staff, to obtain the full co-operation of the Admiralty. The soon-to-be-scrapped battleship  provided some footage of a capital ship's 15-inch gun turrets in action, and was used for scenes set on board HMS Hood, Prince of Wales, King George V, and Bismarck herself. The cruiser , now preserved in London, was used to depict the cruisers involved in Bismarcks pursuit, including , Suffolk, Sheffield and Dorsetshire. A  in reserve was used as the set for Bismarcks destruction, and one of her tall raked funnels is glimpsed in the final scenes.

The aircraft carrier  is briefly shown as herself, despite the postwar addition of a large angled flight deck and a massive Type 984 "searchlight" radar; the same ship is also used to depict HMS Ark Royal sailing from Gibraltar. All flying from both carriers was filmed aboard  – clearly marked with her postwar pennant number R06 – and three surviving Fairey Swordfish aircraft were restored, of which two were flown from her flight deck. These three aircraft now form the core of the Royal Navy Historic Flight. A 2010 article in Aeroplane identifies the Swordfish flown in the production: LS326, carrying its true serial, was marked as "5A" of 825 Naval Air Squadron, while NF389 was marked as LS423 / "5B". The same actor plays the leader of the Swordfish attack from HMS Victorious (in reality, Lt Cdr Eugene Esmonde VC, DSO), and also the pilot from HMS Ark Royal who later fired the torpedo which crippled Bismarcks steering gear (in reality Lt John Moffat RNR).

Their pennant numbers can be made out quite clearly, although they are reversed because of the film's convention that British ships should move from left to right on the screen and German ships vice versa. These were the last classes of destroyer built during the war, and the last to have the classic War Emergency Programme destroyers' outline. HMS Cavalier remained in service until 1972, the last RN destroyer to have served in the Second World War, and is now preserved at Chatham Dockyard to commemorate all these vessels, but the newer and larger HMS Hogue was broken up shortly after the film was completed, following a collision off Ceylon with the Indian cruiser  (formerly ).

The large models of the major warships Bismarck, HMS Hood, HMS Prince of Wales, HMS King George V, HMS Rodney and the s, are generally accurate, although HMS Hood is depicted in a slightly earlier configuration than that which actually blew up. The use of models in a studio tank was intercut with wartime footage and staged sequences using available full-size warships. Bismarck anti-aircraft guns, however, are represented by stock footage of British QF 2-pounder naval guns.

Historical accuracySink the Bismarck! was made before 1975, when the British code-breaking at Bletchley Park was declassified, so it did not reveal that Shepard's hunches about the movements of the Bismarck were supported by intelligence. Direction finding and traffic analysis showed that on 25 May, Bismarck stopped talking to Wilhelmshaven and resumed with Paris, and Shepard committed to the belief that Bismarck was headed for the French coast. The radio switch from Wilhelmshaven to Paris might have been caused by Bismarck crossing the line between southern Greenland and the northern Hebrides, which placed her under Group West instead of Group North. Nonetheless, Shepard's hunch was proved correct when, by good luck, a Luftwaffe Enigma transmission was intercepted and decoded at Bletchley Park, revealing that Bismarck was headed for Brest to repair an oil leak. The Luftwaffe's Enigma code had been broken early in the war, unlike the German naval Enigma code, which was only broken later and was subject only to traffic analysis during the Bismarck pursuit. Damage during its battle with HMS Hood and HMS Prince of Wales caused flooding that put Bismarcks bow barely above sea level. Oil slicks caused by hits from HMS Prince of Wales were apparent. In the film, Bismarcks bow remains at its normal height above sea level.

Some minor continuity errors involve the visual appearance of Bismarck. When a spy in Kristiansand, Norway, sees Bismarck arrive in Norwegian waters (sailing from the east), the ship is shown sailing from right to left (from the west). Bismarck has no apparent camouflage but in fact, the ship still had striped "Baltic camouflage" along her sides, which was removed shortly before she headed out to sea. Also, the photo-reconnaissance Spitfire that photographs Bismarck and Prinz Eugen in a fjord is shown as two different versions, each with different canopies.Sink the Bismarck! simplifies the movements of HMS Hood and HMS Prince of Wales in the battle. The film shows an early order to turn to allow the British ships to fire full broadsides. In reality, they sought to close the distance first, presenting smaller targets to the German ships but using only their forward gun turrets which reduced their firepower advantage by eight big guns, while Bismarck and Prinz Eugen were firing full broadsides of all their main guns. The film does not show that HMS Hood mistook heavy cruiser Prinz Eugen for Bismarck, at first firing at the wrong ship before correcting her fire. Only in its final moments did HMS Hood begin a turn to fire a broadside on Bismarck. HMS Hood was hit during this turn and she exploded. The turn presented Hoods deck armour at an angle more vulnerable to shell penetration and has been cited as a possible cause for the explosion and her subsequent destruction, an issue the film does not cover. HMS Hood is shown firing to port while the Bismarck is shown firing to starboard; in fact it was the other way around.

In one scene, Lütjens speculates that after Bismarck has undergone repair in Brest, the two German battleships based there, Gneisenau and Scharnhorst, could join Bismarck in raiding Allied shipping. There is no record of such a discussion at that time, although it would have been possible for Bismarck to sortie with the two battleships if Bismarck had reached the port.

Another historical deviation was made in depicting the night engagement between British destroyers and Bismarck. The film portrayal shows three British hits by torpedoes, while the British destroyer HMS Solent is hit and destroyed by Bismarck. There was no destroyer named Solent and no successful torpedo attack, although S-class submarine  did exist during the war as a submarine operating in the Eastern Fleet in 1944. The heroic action of the attached Polish destroyer  (ex N-class HMS Nerissa) was not depicted, although she sailed straight for Bismarck, signalling "I am a Pole" as she went, but none of her shots found their mark.

The aircraft that finally located Bismarck after she escaped detection by HMS Suffolk and HMS Norfolk is correctly shown as a Catalina, but the fact that it was piloted by an American Naval Reserve officer, Ensign Leonard Smith, could not be revealed until long after the war, since the United States was neutral at the time of the engagement. The attacks by Fleet Air Arm Swordfish show some aircraft being shot down; no Swordfish was lost to Bismarcks guns and all were recovered. However, from HMS Victoriouss air raid, two Fairey Fulmar escort fighters ran out of fuel and ditched. Three fliers were picked up from a rubber boat.Sink the Bismarck! also does not show controversial events after Bismarck sank, including 's quick departure after rescuing only 110 survivors, because the ship suspected that a German U-boat was in the area and withdrew.

Portrayal of Günther Lütjens
The film has been criticised for its portrayal of German Admiral Günther Lütjens, who is portrayed as a stereotypical Nazi, committed to Nazism and crazed in his undaunted belief that Bismarck is unsinkable. In reality, Lütjens did not agree with Nazi policies; along with two other navy commanders, he had publicly protested against the brutality of antisemitic crimes during Kristallnacht.  He is portrayed as saying “Never forget that you are Nazis”, but the term "Nazi” was a short form pejorative term used by Germans to refer to the full name "Nationalsozialistiche" ("National Socialist") that has become the common name used in English to refer to the ideology and its followers.  He was one of the few officers who refused to give the Nazi salute when Hitler visited Bismarck before its first and final mission, deliberately using instead the traditional naval salute.  He was pessimistic of the chances of success of Bismarcks mission and realised that it would be a daunting task. The film shows Lütjens ordering Captain Ernst Lindemann to open fire on HMS Hood and HMS Prince of Wales. In reality, Lütjens ordered Lindemann to avoid engaging HMS Hood; Lindemann refused and ordered the ship's guns to open fire.

Reception

Critical
For the most part, the historical accuracy in Sink the Bismarck! was praised by critics, with Variety calling it a "first-rate film re-creation of a thrilling historical event". A contemporary The New York Times review by A. H. Weiler, likewise championed its realism in saying "a viewer could not ask for greater authenticity". However, it went on to criticise both the acting and the constant scene changes "from Admiralty plotting rooms to the bridges of the ships at sea", claiming that this lessened the "over-all effectiveness" of both scenes. Film4 praised its cinematography, noting that it "very realistically re-enacted scenes in the War Room of the Admiralty" as well as "excellently filmed episodes using miniature models".

During the postwar period, war films were one staple of the British film industry, with Sink the Bismarck! an exemplar, sharing the "common themes, actors ... visual style and ideological messages" of the genre. British magazine Radio Times viewed Sink the Bismarck! positively, stating that "this fine film fully captures the tensions, dangers and complexities of battle by concentrating on the unsung back-room planners as much as on the combatants themselves" while also praising More's performance. Attention was drawn to the ways in which it deviated from other war films of the period, specifically commenting on how "there is a respect for the enemy that is missing in many previous flag-wavers". The film was given a four-star rating.

Gilbert's continual forays into events that shaped the British war experience mirrored his own background as a wartime filmmaker. His films merged historical episodes and the role of the individual, with Sink the Bismarck! characterised as having an "emotional punch, not least because Gilbert's direction relentlessly focuses on the human dimension amidst the history".

Box officeSink the Bismarck! was well received by the public and, according to Kine Weekly, it was the second  most popular film released in Great Britain in 1960 (after Doctor in Love).  The film replicated the success of other British war-themed productions in the decade that also received healthy box office, including The Cruel Sea (1953), The Dam Busters (1955) and Reach for the Sky (1956). Unlike most British war films Sink the Bismarck! was a surprise hit in North America.

Other productions
A revival of interest in the Bismarck was reflected in numerous publications that followed the film, as well as a variety of scale models that were produced. When the 1989 expedition by Dr. Robert Ballard to locate and photograph the remains of the battleship proved to be successful, further attention was directed to the story of the Bismarck. A number of documentaries have also been produced including the Channel 4 miniseries Battle of Hood and Bismarck (2002) and Hunt for the Bismarck aired in 2007 on the History Channel network worldwide.

See also
 Battle of the Denmark Strait
 Operation Rheinübung – history of the sortie of Bismarck and Prinz Eugen Last battle of the battleship Bismarck

References

Notes

Citations

Bibliography

 Allon, Yoram, Del Cullen and Hannah Patterson, eds. Contemporary British and Irish Film Directors: A Wallflower Critical Guide. New York: Wallflower Press (Columbia University Press), 2002. .
 Ballard, Robert D. and Rick Archbold. The Discovery of the Bismarck: Germany's Greatest Battleship Surrenders Her Secrets. New York: Warner Books Inc., 1990. .
 Budiansky, Stephen. Battle of Wits: The Complete Story of Codebreaking in World War II. New York: Touchstone, 2002. .
 Dolan, Edward F. Jr. Hollywood Goes to War. London: Bison Books, 1985. .
 Emsley, Clive et al. War, Culture and Memory. Milton Keynes, Buckinghamshire, UK: Open University Course Team, 2003. .
 Erickson, Glenn. DVD Savant: A Review Resource Book. Rockville, Maryland: Wildside Press, 2004. .
 Evans, Alun. Brassey's Guide to War Films. Dulles, Virginia: Potomac Books, 2000. .
 Forester, C. S. Sink the Bismarck! The Greatest Sea Chase in Military History, (John Gresham Military Library Selection),  originally published as the Last Nine Days of the Bismarck. New York: Ibooks, Inc, 2003. .
 Frietas, Gary A. War Movies: The Belle & Blade Guide to Classic War Videos. Bandon, Oregon: Robert D. Reed Publishers, 2011. .
 Hyams, Jay. War Movies. New York: W. H. Smith Publishers, Inc., 1984. .
 
 Lovell, George. Consultancy, Ministry & Mission. London: Continuum, 2000. .
 Mayo, Mike. Videohound's War Movies: Classic Conflict on Film. Canton, Michigan: Visible Ink Press, 1999. .
 Mcgowen, Tom. Sink The Bismarck (Military Might). Kirkland, Washington: 21st Century, 1999. .
 Niemi, Robert. History in the Media: Film and Television. Santa Barbara, California: ABC/CLIO, 2006. .
 Polmar, Norman and Christopher P. Cavas. Navy's Most Wanted: The Top 10 Book of Admirable Admirals, Sleek Submarines, and Other Naval Oddities (Most Wanted Series). Dulles, Virginia: Potomac Books Inc., 2009. .
 Shipman, David. The Great Movie Stars: The International Years. London: Angus & Robertson, 1980. .
 Solomon, Aubrey. Twentieth Century Fox: A Corporate and Financial History (The Scarecrow Filmmakers Series). Lanham, Maryland: Scarecrow Press, 1989. .
 Whitley, M. J. Destroyers of World War Two: An International Encyclopedia. Annapolis, Maryland: US Naval Institute Press, 2000. .
 Zetterling, Niklas and Michael Tamelander. Tirpitz: The Life and Death of Germany's Last Super Battleship.'' Havertown, Pennsylvania: Casemate Publishers and Book Distributors, L.L.C., 2009. .

External links

1960 films
1960 war films
20th Century Fox films
German battleship Bismarck
British war films
British World War II films
British black-and-white films
CinemaScope films
1960s English-language films
Seafaring films based on actual events
World War II films based on actual events
Royal Navy in World War II films
Films based on British novels
Films scored by Clifton Parker
Films set in 1941
Films set in London
Films shot at Pinewood Studios
Films directed by Lewis Gilbert
Films based on works by C. S. Forester
1960s British films